Frank Ellis may refer to:

Frank Ellis (radiologist) (1905–2006), English scientist
Frank Ellis (Ontario politician), Canadian politician
Frank Ellis (actor) (1897–1969), American actor who appeared in King of the Congo and Two Tars
Frank Ellis (lecturer), former Leeds University lecturer
Frank Burton Ellis (1907–1969), U.S. federal judge
Frank Ellis (footballer) (1883–1957), Australian rules footballer
Frank H. Ellis (1896–1979), Canadian aviator and historian
Frank Ellis (Indiana politician) (1842–1919), mayor of Muncie, Indiana
Frank Ellis (coach), American football coach and college athletics administrator

See also

Francis Ellis (disambiguation)